In Orthodox Christian belief, the Holy Fire ("Holy Light") is a proposed miracle that occurs every year at the Church of the Holy Sepulchre in Jerusalem on Great Saturday, the day before Orthodox Easter. However, the authenticity of the miracle has long been disputed.

Description from within the Orthodox faith
Orthodox tradition holds that the Holy Fire happens annually on the day preceding Orthodox Pascha (Orthodox Easter). During this time, blue light is said to emit within Jesus' tomb, rising from the marble slab covering the stone bed believed to be that upon which Jesus' body is to have been placed for burial. The marble slab is now in the Church of the Holy Sepulchre in the Old City of Jerusalem. The light is believed to form a column of fire, from which candles are lit. This fire is then used to light the candles of the clergy and pilgrims in attendance. The fire is also said to spontaneously light other lamps and candles around the church. Pilgrims and clergy say that the Holy Fire does not burn them.

Before the fire is lit, the Patriarch kneels inside the chapel in front of the stone, with crowds gathered outside. When the fire is lit, the Patriarch comes out of the church with two lit candles. Thousands of pilgrims as well as local Christians of all denominations gather in Jerusalem to partake and witness this annual event.

The Holy Fire is taken to Greece by special flight, and similarly to other Orthodox countries or countries with major Orthodox churches, such as Georgia, Bulgaria, Lebanon, Romania, Egypt, Cyprus, North Macedonia, Serbia, Ukraine and Russia, being received by church and state leaders.

History

The historian Eusebius writes in his Life of Constantine, which dates from around 328, about an interesting occurrence in Jerusalem of Easter in the year 162. When the church wardens were about to fill the lamps to make them ready to celebrate the resurrection of Jesus, they suddenly noticed that there was no more oil left to pour in the lamps. Upon this, Bishop Narcissus of Jerusalem ordered the candles to be filled with water. He then told the wardens to ignite them. In front of the eyes of all present every single lamp burned as if filled with pure oil. Christian Orthodox tradition holds that this miracle, which predates the construction of the Holy Sepulchre in the 4th century, is related to the Miracle of the Holy Fire, though doctrine states differences between the two, as the former was a one-time occurrence while the Miracle of the Holy Fire occurs every year. However, they have in common the premise that God has produced fire where there should, logically speaking, have been none.

Around 385, Egeria, a noble woman from Spain, traveled to Palestine. In the account of her journey, she speaks of a ceremony by the Holy Sepulchre of Christ, where a light comes forth (ejicitur) from the small chapel enclosing the tomb, by which the entire church is filled with an infinite light.

Despite these previous instances, the Holy Fire is believed to have been first recorded by the Christian pilgrim, Bernard the Wise (Bernardus Monachus), in 867.

Under Baldwin I, Latin clergy had taken over the Holy Sepulchre, and according to Christopher Tyerman, the Greek clergy were restored "after the fiasco of the failure of the regular Easter miracle of the Holy Fire under Latin auspices in 1101, the annual ritual on Easter eve when Holy Fire is supposed to descend from heaven to light the priests' candles in the edicule of the Holy Sepulchre. The newcomers evidently had not learnt the knack."

Nevertheless, other sources describe that the Holy Fire appeared in the holy grave on Sunday (Easter day), when the Latin archbishop Daimbert was not in Holy Sepulchre and processing was carried over by Greeks and other orthodox Christians. The holy grave was closed during this period by Daimbert.

The ceremony was marred in 2002 when a disagreement between the Armenian and Greek bishops over who should emerge first with the Holy Fire led to a struggle between the factions. In the course of the scuffle, the Greek Patriarch twice blew the Armenian's candle out, forcing him to reignite his "Holy Fire" using a cigarette lighter, while the Greek Patriarch was despoiled of one of his shoes. In the end the Israeli Police entered the premises to restore order.

Criticism and opposition
In 1009, Fatimid caliph Al-Hakim bi-Amr Allah ordered the destruction of the Holy Sepulchre and its associated buildings, apparently outraged by what he regarded as the fraud practiced by the monks in the "miraculous" descent of the Holy Fire. The chronicler Yahia said that "only those things that were too difficult to demolish were spared." Processions were prohibited, and a few years later all of the convents and churches in Palestine were said to have been destroyed or confiscated. In 1238, Pope Gregory IX denounced the Holy Fire as a fraud and forbade Franciscans from participating in the ceremony. Similarly, many Christians have remained unconvinced by the occurrence. According to Shihab al-Din al-Qarafi, the 13th-century Ayyubid ruler Al-Muazzam Turanshah (r. 1249–1250) is mentioned as having discovered the fraudulence of the Holy Fire; however, he allowed the monks to continue their fraud in exchange for money. The Ottoman traveller, Evliya Çelebi (1611–1682), said that a hidden zinc jar of naphtha was dripped down a chain by a hidden monk. Edward Gibbon (1737–1794), wrote scathingly about the alleged phenomenon in the concluding volume of The History of the Decline and Fall of the Roman Empire:

This pious fraud, first devised in the ninth century, was devoutly cherished by the Latin crusaders, and is annually repeated by the clergy of the Greek, Armenian, and Coptic sects, who impose on the credulous spectators for their own benefit and that of their tyrants.

Thomas Tegg, a 19th-century Englishman, included an account of the event in The London Encyclopaedia, published in 1828, speculating that the event is purely natural and motivated by pecuniary interest.

Some Greeks have been critical of the Holy Fire, such as Adamantios Korais, who condemned what he considered to be religious fraud in his treatise "On the Holy Light of Jerusalem." He referred to the event as "machinations of fraudulent priests" and to the "unholy" light of Jerusalem as "a profiteers' miracle". In 2005, in a live demonstration on Greek television, Michael Kalopoulos, author and historian of religion, dipped three candles in white phosphorus. The candles spontaneously ignited after approximately 20 minutes due to the self-ignition properties of white phosphorus when in contact with air. According to Kalopoulos' website:

If phosphorus is dissolved in an appropriate organic solvent, self-ignition is delayed until the solvent has almost completely evaporated. Repeated experiments showed that the ignition can be delayed for half an hour or more, depending on the density of the solution and the solvent employed.

Kalopoulos also says that chemical reactions of this nature were well known in ancient times, quoting Strabo, who states: "In Babylon there are two kinds of naphtha springs, a white and a black. The white naphtha is the one that ignites with fire." (Strabon Geographica 16.1.15.1-24) He further states that phosphorus was used by Chaldean magicians in the early fifth century BC, and by the ancient Greeks, in a way similar to its supposed use today by the Eastern Orthodox Patriarch of Jerusalem.

Russian skeptic Igor Dobrokhotov has analysed the evidence for an alleged miracle at length on his website, including the ancient sources and contemporary photos and videos. Dobrokhotov and other critics, including Russian Orthodox researcher Nikolay Uspensky, Dr. Aleksandr Musin of Sorbonne, and some Old Believers quote excerpts from the diaries of Bishop Porphyrius (Uspensky) (1804–1885), which told that the clergy in Jerusalem knew that the Holy Fire was fraudulent.

In his book, the journalist Dimitris Alikakos presents an interview with the skeuophylax Archbishop Isidoros of the Patriarchate of Jerusalem, in which the former admits that the "Sleepless Candle", which he, himself, puts into the Church of the Holy Sepulchre during the morning of the Holy Saturday, is ignited by him with a lighter. The former (1984–1988) skeuophylax Archbishop Nikiforos makes the same acknowledgement, except that he was using matches. In the same book, Archbishop Gerason Theofanis states that the Holy Fire does not light up in a miraculous, but in a natural way, and it is then blessed by the Patriarch. He adds: "we deceive the believers letting them believe that it is a miracle. This is unacceptable, and does not reflect well on us". According to Theofanis, the fraud of the "miracle" was invented by Catholic crusaders a few centuries ago, and was later continued by the Greek Orthodox Patriarchate. In addition, the Metropolitan Bishop Kornilios of Petras, surrogate of the Jerusalem Patriarchate in 2001, confirmed an older interview, saying that he also had ignited the candles of the Holy Fire with a natural candle, and he described in full detail what he saw when he entered the Church of the Holy Sepulchre. Lastly, in his book, the journalist mentions the chronicle of the deletion of the word "miracle" from the official website of the Patriarchate on 23 June 2018, with the commandment of the Patriarch Theofilos III.

One of the Armenian torchbearers, a task that is usually passed down from father to son (or other male member of a torchbearer's family), has admitted that his father revealed to him that the source of the fire was ancient and symbolic but not a miracle. He said: "The Greek priests bring in a lamp - one that has been kept burning for 1,500 years - to produce the Holy Fire. For pilgrims full of faith who come from abroad, it is a fire from Heaven, a true miracle. But not for us."

See also
 Paschal cycle

References

External links 

 Holy Fire website
 Reuters report on the Holy Fire on Youtube
 "The Holy Light in Jerusalem: Testimonies and Evidence" by the Orthodox Outlet for Dogmatic Enquiries
 "Miracle of the Holy Fire" by Niels Christian Hvidt.
 "Orthodox Christians Celebrate Holy Fire Ritual" from National Public Radio
 "Sparks from the Holy Fire", by Victoria Clark for The Tablet, 3 May 2003.
 Holy Fire book by Haris Skarlakidis.

Eastern Orthodox spirituality
Easter liturgy
Christianity in Jerusalem
Christian terminology
Christian miracles
Fire in religion
Church of the Holy Sepulchre
Annual events in Israel